Trzcinno may refer to the following places:
Trzcinno, Pomeranian Voivodeship (north Poland)
Trzcinno, Szczecinek County in West Pomeranian Voivodeship (north-west Poland)
Trzcinno, Wałcz County in West Pomeranian Voivodeship (north-west Poland)